The Benin Basketball Super League is the highest level basketball league in Benin. The competition is organised annually by the Fédération Beninoise de Basket-ball.

In 2020 the league became professional as the Benisese government under President Patrice Talon passed a law that required all sports clubs to be operated as companies. The move also allowed foreign players to compete in the league.

Current teams
As of the 2021 season, the Super League consisted out of the following teams:
ASPAC
ASPAL BBC
Energie BBC
Eternel BBC
Real Sports
Renaissance Basket-ball
Elan Sportif
Espoir de Cotonou

Champions

References

Benin
Basketball in Benin